In War and Pieces is the thirteenth album by the German thrash metal band Sodom. It was released on 19 November 2010 in Germany, 22 November 2010 in Europe, and 11 January 2011 in the United States.

The album was released in four formats:
 Limited edition digipak with bonus live CD including 10 tracks (Wacken, 25th anniversary show 2007)
 Double gatefold LP in blood red vinyl with 1 bonus track ("Murder One")
 Standard version
 Download
In War and Pieces sold over 700 copies in the United States in its first week.

Track listing

Personnel
Sodom
 Tom Angelripper – bass guitar, vocals
 Bernd "Bernemann" Kost – guitars
 Bobby Schottkowski – drums
Production
 Waldemar Sorychta – producer, engineering, mixing, mastering
 Dennis Koehne – engineering, mixing, mastering
 Eliran Kantor – artwork
 Olli Eppmann – photography

Charts

References

Sodom (band) albums
2010 albums
Albums with cover art by Eliran Kantor
Albums produced by Waldemar Sorychta